FM-3000 is a mobile short-to-medium range air defense missile system unveiled by China Aerospace Science and Industry Corporation at the 2014 Zhuhai Airshow. It uses a 6x6 TEL truck with 8 missile tubes. Engagement range is  against aircraft and  against missiles. Each unit has a rotating rotary phased-array radar and 4 launch vehicles and can handle 32 different targets simentaneously in a short time. Guidance is inertial, plus low speed command guidance and terminal active radar homing.

References

Missile defense
Surface-to-air missiles of the People's Republic of China
Military vehicles introduced in the 2010s